Sam Jaimes is an American animator from Hanna-Barbera Studios and Mendelson-Melendez Productions, who got his start with Disney Studios after serving in the US Navy. He animated for the Peanuts cartoon specials and movies. He directed seven Peanuts specials in the 1980s.

Films
 Sleeping Beauty (1959)--inbetweener
 The Man Called Flintstone (1966)--assistant animator
 A Boy Named Charlie Brown (1969)--animator
 Snoopy, Come Home (1972)--graphic blandishment
 Race for Your Life, Charlie Brown (1977)--animator
 The Lord of the Rings (1978)--animator
 Bon Voyage, Charlie Brown (and Don't Come Back!!) (1980)--animator

Television specials
 Alice in Wonderland or What's a Nice Kid Like You Doing in a Place Like This? (1966)--assistant animator
 It Was a Short Summer, Charlie Brown (1969)--graphic blandishment
 Play It Again, Charlie Brown (1971)--graphic blandishment
 Babar Comes to America (1971)--graphic blandishment
 You're Not Elected, Charlie Brown (1972)--graphic blandishment
 There's No Time for Love, Charlie Brown (1973)--graphic blandishment
 A Charlie Brown Thanksgiving (1973)--graphic blandishment
 It's a Mystery, Charlie Brown (1974)--graphic blandishment
 It's the Easter Beagle, Charlie Brown (1974)--animator
 Yes, Virginia, There Is a Santa Claus (1974)--animator
 Be My Valentine, Charlie Brown (1975)--animator
 You're a Good Sport, Charlie Brown (1975)--animator
 It's Arbor Day, Charlie Brown (1976)--animator
 A Flintstone Christmas (1977)--animator
 It's Your First Kiss, Charlie Brown (1977)--animator
 What a Nightmare, Charlie Brown! (1978)--animator
 You're the Greatest, Charlie Brown (1979)--animator
 She's a Good Skate, Charlie Brown (1980)--animator
 Life Is a Circus, Charlie Brown (1980)--animator
 It's Magic, Charlie Brown (1981)--animator
 No Man's Valley (1981)--animator
 Someday You'll Find Her, Charlie Brown (1981)--animator
 A Charlie Brown Celebration (1981)--animator
 Here Comes Garfield (1982)--animator
 It's an Adventure, Charlie Brown (1983)--sequence director/animator
 Garfield on the Town (1983)--animator
 It's Flashbeagle, Charlie Brown (1984)--director
 It's Your 20th Television Anniversary, Charlie Brown (1985) - director of animation
 You're a Good Man, Charlie Brown (1985)--director
 Molly and the Skywalkerz: Happily Ever After (1985)--animator
 Happy New Year, Charlie Brown! (1985)--director
 Snoopy: The Musical (1988)--director/animator
 It's the Girl in the Red Truck, Charlie Brown (1988)--graphic blandishment
 Why, Charlie Brown, Why? (1990)--director/animator
 Snoopy's Reunion (1991)--director
 It's Spring Training, Charlie Brown (1992)--director/animator
 Frosty Returns (1992)--animator
 You're in the Super Bowl, Charlie Brown (1993)--graphic blandishment
 It Was My Best Birthday Ever, Charlie Brown (1997)--graphic blandishment
 Jasper: The Story of a Mule (2005)--character designer

Television series
 Frankenstein, Jr. and the Impossibles (1966)--animator
 Moby Dick and the Mighty Mightor (1967)--animator
 The New Adventures of Huckleberry Finn (1968)--animator
 The Adventures of Gulliver (1968)--animator
 The Charlie Brown and Snoopy Show (1983–1985)--director/segment director (9 episodes)
 This Is America, Charlie Brown (1990–1989)--director (3 episodes)
 Garfield and Friends (1988–1994)--animator (1 episode - 1994)

References

External links
 

Living people
American animators
American animated film directors
Hanna-Barbera people
Year of birth missing (living people)